The Day of Days is a lost 1914 American drama film directed by Daniel Frohman and written by Louis Joseph Vance. The film stars Cyril Scott, Sadie Harris, David Wall, Arthur Donaldson and Leonard Grover. The film was released on January 20, 1914, by Paramount Pictures.

Plot

Cast 
Cyril Scott as Percival Subarite
Sadie Harris as Marian Blessington
David Wall as Bayard Shaynon
Arthur Donaldson as Brian Shaynon
Leonard Grover as George Bross
Mabel Halsey as Violet
Hal Clarendon as B. Penfield / Hajji, the beggar
Anabel Dennison as Mrs. Inch
Julia Walcott as Boardinghouse mistress

References

External links 
 
 
 imagery in Famous Players Herald Ad, 2 parts

1914 films
1910s English-language films
Silent American drama films
1914 drama films
Paramount Pictures films
American black-and-white films
American silent feature films
Films based on American novels
Lost American films
1914 lost films
Lost drama films
1910s American films